The 1987 U.S. Open was the 87th U.S. Open, held June 18–21 at the Olympic Club in San Francisco, California. Scott Simpson passed and held off 1982 champion Tom Watson on the Lake Course to win his only major title by one stroke.

Eleven former champions were in the field and only four made the 36-hole cut.

This was the third U.S. Open at the Lake Course of the Olympic Club, the previous two in 1955 and 1966 ended in playoffs. The U.S. Open returned in 1998 and 2012; both were won by one stroke.

Course layout
Olympic Club - Lake Course

Lengths of the course for previous major championships:
, par 70 - 1966 U.S. Open
, par 70 - 1955 U.S. Open

Past champions in the field

Made the cut

Missed the cut 

Source:

Round summaries

First round
Thursday, June 18, 1987

Second round
Friday, June 19, 1987

Amateurs: Alexander (+13), Parker (+13).

Third round
Saturday, June 20, 1987

Final round
Sunday, June 21, 1987

Watson held a share of the lead after 36 holes, then took a one-shot lead over Simpson and Keith Clearwater into the final round. Clearwater, 27, shot a six-under 64 on Saturday to get into the final pair with Watson. Watson struggled out of the gate on Sunday on Olympic's difficult start; he bogeyed the first two holes and the fifth as well. Simpson birdied the first but then had three bogeys in four holes. With consecutive birdies at 8 and 9, Watson carried a one-stroke lead to the back nine. Simpson, a group ahead on the course, took the lead with a 30-footer (9 m) for birdie at 15, but Watson responded with a birdie at 14 to tie. With a par on 18, Simpson was in the clubhouse with a 68 and Watson needed a birdie to a force a Monday playoff. His  putt narrowly missed and Simpson was the champion by a stroke. In the final pairing, Clearwater had trouble both early and late and shot a 79 (+9) to fade to a tie for 31st. Seve Ballesteros finished in solo third place, his best career finish in a U.S. Open.

Scorecard
Final round

Cumulative tournament scores, relative to par
{|class="wikitable" span = 50 style="font-size:85%;
|-
|style="background: Pink;" width=10|
|Birdie
|style="background: PaleGreen;" width=10|
|Bogey
|style="background: Green;" width=10|
|Double bogey
|style="background: Olive;" width=10|
|Triple bogey+
|}
Source:

References

External links
GolfCompendium.com: 1987 U.S. Open
USGA Championship Database
USOpen.com – 1987

U.S. Open (golf)
Golf in California
Sports competitions in San Francisco
U.S. Open
U.S. Open (golf)
U.S. Open (golf)